Big Matches are annual cricket matches played between rival schools in Sri Lanka. These schools have played against one another for many years, some for over a century. Big Matches have become an important part of modern Sri Lankan culture, with both school children and adults taking part in the activity.

Most big matches are played over two days. Three big matches (the Royal–Thomian, St. Thomas–St. Servatius and Central–St. John) are notably played over three days.

List of Big Matches

Notes

References

External links
 
 
 

 
Student sport in Sri Lanka
Sri Lankan domestic cricket competitions
Schools cricket matches